Special camp may refer to:

NKVD special camps in Germany 1945–49
NKVD filtration camps, originally known as NKVD special camps
MVD special camp (:ru:Особые лагеря, since 1948)
Occasional classification of some gulag camp complexes : Special-Purpose OGPU Camps (лагеря ОГПУ особого назначения): e.g. Соловецкие лагеря особого назначения (Solovki prison camp), etc.